During the 2014 season, the National Adult League, an American soccer league, saw the expansion of the South Florida market with five added teams joining the NAL–Florida. The schedule for the Florida division was announced in May with each team to play an 8-game schedule.

The five new clubs were:

References 

NAL